Songs from Here & Back is a 2006 live album by The Beach Boys released through Hallmark Gold Crown Stores and only available for two months.  The album contains nine never-before-released live recordings, as well as three solo studio recordings, one by each of Brian Wilson, Mike Love and Al Jardine. The live tracks were recorded in 1989 except "Wouldn't It Be Nice" and "Good Vibrations" which are from 1974.

Track listing
"Intro" – 0:27
"Dance, Dance, Dance" – 2:08
"Wouldn't It Be Nice" – 2:42
"Surfer Girl" – 3:01
"Kokomo" – 4:33
"Car Medley Intro" – 1:18
"Little Deuce Coupe" – 1:46
"I Get Around" – 2:26
"Good Vibrations" – 4:38
"Spirit of Rock & Roll" (Brian Wilson) – 3:09
"PT Cruiser" (Al Jardine) – 2:47 
"Cool Head, Warm Heart" (Mike Love) – 3:15

Personnel
Personnel per 2006 liner notes.

1989 live songs 
 Brian Wilson – vocals, possible keyboards
 Mike Love – vocals
 Al Jardine – vocals, rhythm guitar
 Carl Wilson – vocals, lead guitar
 Bruce Johnston – vocals, keyboards
with
 Ed Carter – bass
 Jeff Foskett – vocals, rhythm guitar
 Billy Hinsche – vocals, keyboards
 Matt Jardine – vocals, percussion
 Mike Meros – keyboards
 Mike Kowalski – drums

1974 live songs (“Wouldn’t It Be Nice” and “Good Vibrations”) 
 Mike Love – vocals, electro-theremin on “Good Vibrations”
 Al Jardine – vocals, rhythm guitar
 Carl Wilson – vocals, lead guitar 
 Dennis Wilson – vocals
 Ricky Fataar – drums
with
 Ron Altbach – keyboards
 Ed Carter – bass
 Bobby Figueroa – percussion
 Billy Hinsche – vocals, keyboards
 Carli Munoz – keyboards

“The Spirit of Rock and Roll” 
 Brian Wilson – vocals, piano
 Scott Bennett – vocals, guitar, bass
 Nelson Bragg – vocals, drums, percussion
 Taylor Mills – vocals
 Joel Peskin – saxophone

“PT Cruiser” 
 Al Jardine – lead vocals, 12-string guitar 
 Matt Jardine – backing vocals 
 Adam Jardine – backing vocals 
 Billy Hinsche – piano, musical director
 Ed Carter – bass 
 Bobby Figueroa – drums, percussion 
 Craig Copeland – lead guitar 
 Richie Cannata – tenor saxophone 
 Tom Jacob – Hammond B3 organ

“Cool Head, Warm Heart” 
 Mike Love – lead and backing vocals 
 Adrian Baker – backing vocals 
 Christian Love – backing vocals
 Paul Fauerso – programming, keyboards, percussion, background vocals 
 Cliff Hugo – bass 
 Joel Peskin – tenor saxophone 
 Scott Totten – guitars 
 Curt Bisquera – drums

References

2006 live albums
2006 compilation albums
The Beach Boys live albums
The Beach Boys compilation albums
Live albums published posthumously